Zone B of the 1996 Davis Cup Europe/Africa Group III was one of two zones in the Europe/Africa Group III of the 1996 Davis Cup. 14 teams competed across two pools in a round robin competition, with the top team in each pool advancing to Group II in 1997. In a move to a four-tier system, the bottom three teams in each pool were reassigned to the new Group IV in 1997; all other teams remained in Group III.

Participating nations

Draw
 Venue: Nairobi Club Ground, Nairobi, Kenya
 Date: 8–14 January

Group A

Group B

  and  promoted to Group II in 1997.

Group A

Cyprus vs. Zambia

Djibouti vs. Ireland

Estonia vs. Moldova

Cameroon vs. Estonia

Cyprus vs. Moldova

Djibouti vs. Zambia

Cameroon vs. Moldova

Cyprus vs. Ireland

Estonia vs. Zambia

Cameroon vs. Ireland

Djibouti vs. Estonia

Moldova vs. Zambia

Cameroon vs. Cyprus

Djibouti vs. Moldova

Ireland vs. Zambia

Cameroon vs. Djibouti

Cyprus vs. Estonia

Ireland vs. Moldova

Cameroon vs. Zambia

Cyprus vs. Djibouti

Estonia vs. Ireland

Group B

Kenya vs. Botswana

Bulgaria vs. Monaco

Greece vs. Togo

Botswana vs. Bulgaria

Congo vs. Togo

Greece vs. Monaco

Kenya vs. Bulgaria

Botswana vs. Greece

Congo vs. Monaco

Kenya vs. Greece

Botswana vs. Congo

Monaco vs. Togo

Kenya vs. Congo

Botswana vs. Togo

Bulgaria vs. Greece

Kenya vs. Togo

Botswana vs. Monaco

Bulgaria vs. Congo

Kenya vs. Monaco

Bulgaria vs. Togo

Congo vs. Greece

References

External links
Davis Cup official website

Davis Cup Europe/Africa Zone
Europe Africa Zone Group III